
Gmina Wielopole Skrzyńskie is a rural gmina (administrative district) in Ropczyce-Sędziszów County, Subcarpathian Voivodeship, in south-eastern Poland.

Villages
Gmina Wielopole Skrzyńskie contains the villages and settlements of Broniszów, Brzeziny, Glinik, Nawsie and Wielopole Skrzyńskie.

Neighbouring gminas
Gmina Wielopole Skrzyńskie is bordered by the gminas of Brzostek, Czudec, Frysztak, Iwierzyce, Ropczyce, Sędziszów Małopolski, Strzyżów and Wiśniowa.

References
 Polish official population figures 2006

Wielopole Skrzynskie
Ropczyce-Sędziszów County